Kazanlak Peak is a rocky peak rising to 430 m in Delchev Ridge of Tangra Mountains, Livingston Island in the South Shetland Islands, Antarctica.  Surmounting Bruix Cove to the northwest, Iskar Glacier to the southwest and Sopot Ice Piedmont to the east.  The peak is named after the city of Kazanlak in central Bulgaria.

Location

Map
 L.L. Ivanov. Antarctica: Livingston Island and Greenwich, Robert, Snow and Smith Islands. Scale 1:120000 topographic map.  Troyan: Manfred Wörner Foundation, 2009.

References
 Kazanlak Peak. SCAR Composite Antarctic Gazetteer
 Bulgarian Antarctic Gazetteer. Antarctic Place-names Commission. (details in Bulgarian, basic data in English)

External links
 Kazanlak Peak. Copernix satellite image

Tangra Mountains
Kazanlak